The following is a list of players of the now-defunct Chicago Stags professional basketball team.

Norm Baker
Leo Barnhorst
Mike Bloom
Joe Bradley
Jim Browne
Chet Carlisle
Don Carlson
Bill Davis
Bob Duffy
Jack Eskridge
Chuck Gilmur
Joe Graboski
Bob Hahn
Chick Halbert
Kleggie Hermsen
Paul Huston
Tony Jaros
Johnny Jorgensen
Whitey Kachan
Wibs Kautz
Frank Kudelka
Carl Meinhold
Stan Miasek
Ed Mikan
Bill Miller
George Nostrand
Garland O'Shields
Doyle Parrack
Andy Phillip
Bob Rensberger
Bill Roberts
Gene Rock 
Kenny Rollins
Mickey Rottner
Kenny Sailors
Ben Schadler
Jim Seminoff
Odie Spears
Buck Sydnor
Jack Toomay
Gene Vance
Max Zaslofsky

References
Chicago Stags all-time roster @ basketball-reference.com

National Basketball Association all-time rosters